Hepelivirales is an order of viruses.

Taxonomy
The following families are recognized:
Alphatetraviridae
Benyviridae
Hepeviridae
Matonaviridae

References

Viruses